Niazi Rustem Demi (1919–1977) was an Albanian politician.

Niazi Demi was born in 1919 in Filiates, a town of northwestern Greece located in the region of [[Chameria,(ancient Thesprotia). He studied in Vlorë and then in Tiranë's high school, graduating in late 1930s. In 1942 he joined the ranks of the Albanian National Liberation Front and in 1943 became political commissar of the Berat District brigades. He was also part of the VIIth Attacking Brigade.

After World War II he became initially counsellor of the Albanian ambassador in the USSR and later Minister of Trade of Albania.

Sources 

1977 deaths
1919 births
Albanian politicians
Niazi